Syam is a commune in the Jura department in the Bourgogne-Franche-Comté region in eastern France.

The village is known for the Château de Syam, a large French Empire villa designed by Champennois l'Aîné in 1818.

Population

See also
Communes of the Jura department

References

Communes of Jura (department)